Enid Hammerman Long (born Helen Enid Hammerman; March 23, 1930 — January 27, 2002) was a trustee at Columbia College in Chicago and an advocate for better health care in the United States and developing nations.

Mrs. Long was most widely known for undertaking humanitarian causes for over 25 years at the side of her third husband, Dr. John Long. Her previous marriage was to American diplomat and military officer William R. Rivkin, and she lived in diplomatic missions in Europe and Africa.

Early life
Helen Enid Hammerman was born March 23, 1930 in Chicago, Illinois, to a Jewish family, from Germany, Austria, Galicia, and Russia. Her mother, Cecilia Kagan, was a member of the Jewish-American Sarnatzky family and fled pogroms in Czarist Russia. Celia Kagan was a founder of the North Shore chapter of the National Conference of Christians and Jews. Hammerman's father, Sol Hammerman, was the co-owner with his brother, Meyer Hammerman, of J.K. Industries in Chicago, a company founded by her grandfather. Sol and her Uncle Meyer turned the company into one of the nation's largest children's clothing manufacturers at the time. Growing up in Glencoe, Illinois, Helen Enid graduated from New Trier High School in 1948 and attended Sarah Lawrence College in New York State.

Personal life
In 1952, Helen Enid married John Dreyfus, who she had met in high school in Illinois. Together they had two daughters, Laura and Julia, before Dreyfus died in 1957.
In 1959 she remarried to Chicago attorney and Democratic political organizer William R. Rivkin. When Rivkin was appointed ambassador to Luxembourg, Senegal, and The Gambia, Hammerman accompanied him abroad. Noted for her elegant and gracious manner, she spent 6 years by her husband's side on his appointments overseas. She had two sons with Rivkin, Robert Samuel in 1960 and Charles in 1962. When the senior Rivkin died in 1967, she relocated with her four children back to Chicago.
In 1971, Hammerman married for the third time to Chicago obstetrician Dr. John S. Long.

Adulthood and career
Hammerman's experience abroad in the early 1960s with her second husband drove her towards a life of international service and political involvement. In addition to being a regular at Chicago Council on Foreign Relations lectures, in 1968 she established a prestigious foreign service award, the Rivkin Award, which she founded and named after her late second husband. The Rivkin Award is continued to this day by her children and administered in concert with the American Foreign Service Association.

She was a graduate of Columbia College. When she later joined the college board of trustees, she became known as a persistent voice for students' concerns. In 1967, she hosted the WLS-TV show A.M. Chicago.

From the 1970s until the 1990s, she and her husband helped to bring medical relief to remote regions in Peru, Africa, Thailand and Cambodia. They once narrowly escaped a guerrilla advance in the mountains of Peru, and in 1999 they were involved in relief efforts to Macedonia.
She returned to college in 1971, earning a bachelor's in communications at Columbia in 1973. Passionate about the school's ability to train people for careers in the arts and media, she became a trustee there in 1979 and served on the board until her death.

Enid Hammerman Long died on January 27, 2002, from cancer.

References

2002 deaths
American Jews
Columbia College Chicago alumni
Rivkin family